Theonellidae is a family of sponges belonging to the order Tetractinellida, which was first described by Robert von Lendenfeld in 1903.

Genera
 Colossolacis Schrammen, 1910
 Dactylocalcites
 Discodermia du Bocage, 1869
 Manihinea 
 Racodiscula 
 Siliquariaspongia 
 Theonella

References

Further reading
Theonella: immunology and microbiology

Sponge families
Taxa described in 1903
Taxa named by Robert J. Lendlmayer von Lendenfeld